Danainae is a subfamily of the family Nymphalidae, the brush-footed butterflies. It includes the Daniadae, or milkweed butterflies, who lay their eggs on various milkweeds on which their larvae (caterpillars) feed, as well as the clearwing butterflies (Ithomiini), and the tellervini.

Some 300 species of Danainae exist worldwide. Most of the Danaini are found in tropical Asia and Africa, while the Ithomiini are diverse in the Neotropics. Tellervini are restricted to Australia and the Oriental region. Four species are found in North America: the monarch butterfly (Danaus plexippus), the queen (Danaus gilippus), the tropical milkweed butterfly (Lycorea cleobaea), and the soldier butterfly (or "tropic queen", Danaus eresimus). Of these, the monarch is by far the most famous, being one of the most recognizable butterflies in the Americas.

Taxonomy
Milkweed butterflies are now classified as the subfamily Danainae within the family Nymphalidae; however, the previous family name Danaidae is still occasionally used. The fossil milkweed butterfly Archaeolycorea is known from the Oligocene or Miocene Tremembé Formation of Brazil. It provides evidence that the present milkweed butterflies originated more than 20–30 million years ago.

Characteristics

Larvae have thoracic tubercles and use plants within the family Apocynaceae that often contain latex-like compounds in the stem as hosts. Adults are aposematic (brightly colored as a warning signal).

Threats
Numerous wasps and tachinid flies are parasitoids of milkweed butterfly caterpillars.

The extensive modification of landscapes in the United States and Canada, large-scale use of pesticides, and increased deforestation in Mexico threaten the migratory monarch butterfly.

References

Further reading
Ackery, P. R. & Vane-Wright, R. I. 1984. Milkweed butterflies, their cladistics and biology, being an account of the natural history of the Danainae, a subfamily of the Lepidoptera, Nymphalidae. ix+425 pp. London.

External links

 "Danainae Boisduval, [1833]" at Markku Savela's Lepidoptera and Some Other Life Forms

 
-